Erich Wanner (born 5 April 1969) is a Swiss gymnast. He competed at the 1992 Summer Olympics and the 1996 Summer Olympics.

References

1969 births
Living people
Swiss male artistic gymnasts
Olympic gymnasts of Switzerland
Gymnasts at the 1992 Summer Olympics
Gymnasts at the 1996 Summer Olympics
Place of birth missing (living people)
20th-century Swiss people